FunPlus is a video game developer and publisher headquartered in Switzerland, with operations in China, Japan, Singapore, Spain, Sweden, and the United States. The company has developed the following mobile games: State of Survival, King of Avalon, Guns of Glory, and Call of Antia. FunPlus invests in the esports industry. 

The company's CEO is Andy Zhong and its CTO is Yitao Guan.

History 
FunPlus was founded in 2010 by Andy Zhong and Yitao Guan in Silicon Valley as Halfquest, focusing on web game development in Silicon Valley and Beijing. In Beijing, the company created DianDian Interactive game studio, which became the casual games division of the company. In October 2010, the company launched its first web game, Family Farm, on German social network VZ. In June 2011, the game appeared on Facebook.  

In 2012, the company was relocated to Beijing and rebranded as FunPlus in 2012. In the same year, FunPlus launched it first mobile game, Family Farm Seaside, as well as a second web game, Royal Story.

A third web game, Happy Acres, launched in 2014.  

In the same year, the company established a mobile strategy game studio, KingsGroup, in Beijing.  

KingsGroup launched its first mobile strategy game, King of Avalon, in 2016. In the same year, FunPlus sold its DianDian Interactive studio to the Century Group, a listed company on the Shenzhen stock exchange, for $1 billion, after which the game studio was renamed Century Game. After the sale of DianDian studio, FunPlus focused on investing in other game studios globally as well as developing strategy games, e-sports, live-streaming and game publishing platforms. 

In 2017, KingsGroup launched its second mobile strategy game, Guns of Glory. In 2018, FunPlus started to grow its international studio presence with a new casual studio in Beijing called Puzala, as well as two new mobile development studios in Moscow and Shanghai. 

In 2019, KingsGroup launched and self-published mobile strategy game State of Survival. The game has since achieved more than 100 million downloads. FunPlus continued its international growth with new studios in Stockholm and Tokyo, and a publishing office in Barcelona.  

In 2020, the company's Guangzhou studio was opened. In December 2020, FunPlus opened its corporate global headquarters in Switzerland.

In 2021, FunPlus collaborated with AMC to introduce The Walking Dead to State of Survival.

In April 2021, Imagendary Studios was acquired by FunPlus.

In December 2021, the company collaborated with DC to introduce the Joker to State of Survival.

In January 2022, FunPlus launched the match-3 RPG Call of Antia.

In March 2022, FunPlus announced a partnership with Orlando Bloom to bring his character to mobile strategy title, King of Avalon.

Games

FunPlus Studio

Call of Antia 
Call of Antia is a match-3 RPG game, released in January 2022. Players build their own shire to save their world. They also have to recruit over 50 heroes to defeat the Dark Legion.

KingsGroup 
Founded in 2016 as part of FunPlus, KingsGroup is a mobile game developer focused on creating adventurous strategy games. KingsGroup has developed mobile games that achieved #1 rank in nearly 70 countries, including State of Survival, King of Avalon and Guns of Glory.

State of Survival 
State Of Survival is a multiplayer mobile strategy game, set in a post-apocalyptic world. Players join the game as survivors whose goal is to develop and protect their settlement, rescue other survivors, train their troops, and better understand the disease ravaging the world. By recruiting heroes and forging alliances, players battle zombies and other survivors to rebuild civilization. In 2020, the game won Best Simulation Game at Samsung’s Best of Galaxy Store Awards 2020.

King of Avalon 
King of Avalon: Dragon Warfare is a medieval-themed fantasy strategy game taking action in the Arthurian era, released in 2016. It is similar in both theme and gameplay to Game of War: Fire Age. By mid-April 2019, total revenue value rose to over $721 million, close to doubling within just eight months.

Guns of Glory 
Guns of Glory is a renaissance/steampunk-themed strategy game similar to King of Avalon, released in September 2017. By April 2019, the total revenue was over $510 million. Synopsis: the player is a prisoner, deep in the bowels of the Bastille prison. Hidden from the world behind a locked Iron Mask. The player must escape and survive with the help of an army, built by the player.

Imagendary 
The studio was founded in 2021 in Irvine, California and subsequently acquired by FunPlus, with founder Wei Wang being appointed Chief Creative Officer for FunPlus. In early 2022, Ryan Pollreisz joined Imagendary as the Studio Manager, while Jason Hayes took the position of Audio Director and Matt Cordner took the position of Senior Technical Artist. The studio is working on its first original AAA development using Unreal 5 Engine.

Other games 
Z Day: Hearts of Heroes, a post-apocalyptic strategy game, based on King of Avalon.

Esports 
FunPlus has an esports division named FunPlus Esports that sponsors several esports teams and leagues around the world. In 2017, FunPlus Esports founded FunPlus Phoenix, a professional esports organization with a League of Legends team competing in China's top league (the LPL), and operates the Pacific Championship Series. During its run from mid-2018 to 2019, the League of Legends SEA Tour was operated by FunPlus Esports. In 2018 FunPlus Esports, in partnership with Chinese online game developer NetEase, launched the world's first global battle royale pro league, "Rules of Survival Global Series". In 2019, FunPlus Phoenix won the League Of Legends World Championship in a 3-0 Stomp. In August 2021, FunPlus Phoenix’s mid laner Kim “Doinb” earned the League of Legends Pro League Most Valuable Player award for the 2021 summer split. In 2022, FunPlus Phoenix Wins the Chinese Wild Rift League.

Ventures 
In 2012, FunPlus received funding in the amount of $13 million in the Series A round from several Silicon Valley investors. In the Series B the company’s total funding raised was $87 million. Among other ventures, the investment went to the development of the DianDian Interactive game studio.

In 2014, FunPlus raised $74 million in a series B funding round led by Orchid Asia Group, GSR Ventures, and Steamboat Ventures.

Since 2014, the company has invested in other game studios and game-related projects globally.

In 2016, the company started a $50 million fund to invest in game startups. The first investment that FunPlus made was in Sirvo Studios.

In July 2016, FunPlus invested an undisclosed amount to Singaporean mobile game developer XII Braves.

In June 2021, FunPlus became one of the investors in seed funding for Drop Fake, which raised $9 million. In July 2021, FunPlus led a series B financing round for Singularity 6. The studio has raised $30 million. In the same year, FunPlus participated in the seed funding round for Gardens Studio, in which it raised $4.5 million. 

In 2022, FunPlus invested in Conchship Games with a 25% stake.

References

External links 
 

Video game companies established in 2010
Video game companies of China
Video game development companies
Video game publishers
Mobile game companies